The Creuse river (in French: rivière Creuse) is a tributary of the east bank of the Petite rivière du Chêne which flows onto the south bank of the St. Lawrence River. The Creuse river flows through the municipalities of Villeroy (MRC de L'Érable Regional County Municipality), Sainte-Françoise and Fortierville, in the Bécancour Regional County Municipality, in the administrative region of Centre-du-Québec, in Quebec, in Canada.

Geography 

The main neighboring hydrographic slopes of the Creuse river are:
 north side: Petite rivière du Chêne, rivière aux Ormes, northern arm of Rivière aux Ormes, stream L'Espérance, rivière du Chêne, St. Lawrence River;
 east side: Chêne river;
 south side: Petite rivière du Chêne, Gentilly River, rivière du Moulin, Bécancour River;
 west side: Petite rivière du Chêne, St. Lawrence River, rivière aux Orignaux, rivière aux Glaises.

The Creuse River originates north of the Villeroy rest area of the highway 20, near exit 253.

  westward, passing the north side of the village of Villeroy, to route 265;
  towards the north-west, passing to the south-west of an experimental farm, up to the municipal limit between Villeroy and Sainte-Françoise;
  north-west to a country road;
  north-west, up to a road from tenth and 11th rang;
  north-west, winding up to the municipal limit between Sainte-Françoise and Fortierville;
  towards the west, winding up to the ninth rang road;
  towards the west, winding up to its confluence.

The Creuse river flows onto the east bank of the Petite rivière du Chêne. Its confluence is located at the limit of Rang Frontenac and Rang Saint-Alphonse, at the limit between the municipalities of Fortierville, and Sainte-Sophie-de-Lévrard.

Toponymy 

The toponym “Rivière Creuse” was made official on December 18, 1979, at the Commission de toponymie du Québec.

References

See also 
 List of rivers of Quebec

Rivers of Centre-du-Québec